Daniele Cudini (born 1963 in Fermo) is an Italian painter and sculptor.

Biography 
Born in Fermo, in the Italian region Le Marche, Daniele Cudini completed his secondary education at the Istituto Statale d'Arte in Fermo with the specialisation in ceramics and then continued his studies at the Accademia di Belle Arti
di Macerata with a degree in Painting.

After a few exhibitions around Italy, in 1992 he was invited to exhibit his works at the Galleria nazionale d'artemoderna in Rome and at the Istituto Giapponese di Cultura in the exhibition Giappone Italia nuove generazioni (Japan Italy new generations), where he showed a series of large paintings created with a working technique that makes use of tar.

In 1998 he began his collaboration with Lucio Dalla, who invited him to create a personal exhibition in his gallery in Bologna titled "Inspira Trattieri Respira" (Breath in - Hold - Breath out), featuring a text by Demetrio Paparoni in the catalogue.

In 2001 Umberto Eco invited him to exhibit his works in a solo exhibition titled Interiors at the Istituto Superiore di Scienze Umanistiche in Bologna for the opening of the new academic year. It consisted of 10 large paintings representing interiors where ritual actions take place, both in the intimacy of home and in mythical places such as
church and science.

In the same year he moved to Berlin for a while then exhibited at the NAK Neure Aachener Kunstverein, in Aachen and in 2018 at the Morsbroich Museum in Leverkusen in a group exhibition with international artists Bjork, Stanley Brouwn, Rodney Graham, Bruce Nauman, Panamarenko, Thomas Ruff and Lawrence Weiner.

Exhibitions 
 1989 Paesaggi Resistenti Palazzo dei Diamanti di Ferrara.
 1992 Giappone Italia, Galleria Nazionale D'Arte Moderna edited by Marcella Cossu (group show, cat.).  Paesaggi Resistenti, Palazzo Dei Diamanti Ferrara, Sala Massari (solo show, cat.)
 1993 Museo della Permanente, Milano (group show, cat.)
 1995 The Planet Of Monkey, Galleria Spazia, Bologna (solo show).  Buone Vacanze, Galleria Spazia, Bologna (group show)
 1996 In Trance , Galleria Annina Nosei, Rome (group show, cat.)
 1999 Inspira Trattieni Respira, edited by Lucio Dalla text by Demetrio Paparoni Galleria No Code, Bologna (solo show, cat.).  Smile, Galleria Rizziero Di Sabatino, Teramo (solo show)
 2001 Portraits, The Visual Arts Area Cross Out Project, Berlin (solo show).
 2002 Interiors, edited by Umberto Eco, High School of Humanistic Studies, University of Bologna (solo show).
 2005 Galapagos, edited by Vittoria Coen, Galleria Marabini, Bologna (solo show).  NAK, Neuer Aachener Kunstverein, Aachen.(group show)  Soma, edited by Alberto Zanchetta, Aemil Banca, Bologna (group show).
 2006 Bianco e Nero, Marabini Gallery, Bologna (solo show).  NAK, Neuer Aachener Kunstverein, Aachen (group show, cat.).  Tra Arte e Scienza, Carisbo - Palazzo di Residenza, Bologna (group show).
 2007 Go New York, Marabini Gallery Bologna, edited by Vittoria Coen (solo show).   Musei di Stato Galleria D’Arte Moderna e Contemporanea,   Logge dei Balestrieri, Repubblica di San Marino (solo show).
 2008 Pantanal, edited by Betta Frigieri e Luca Panaro, Paggeriarte, Sassuolo (group show, cat.).  In The House, ex falegnameria Gentili Fermo (solo show).
 2009 Dolce Vita, Felix Ringel Gallery, Düsseldorf (solo show, cat.).  New Classic, edited by Vittoria Coen, Betta Frigieri Arte Contemporanea Modena (solo show, cat).   Felix Ringel Gallery, Düsseldorf (group show).
 2010 Le Bandiere Della Fortuna, Festival Of Philosophy Carpi edited by Luca Panaro (group show).  ColdPlay tour, Felix Ringel Gallery Pechin (group show)
 2011 Mostri D'Italia Betta Frigieri Gallery Modena (solo show)
 2012 La Collezione Del Colonnello Vincente Del Bianco Casino di Caccia Campofilone (FM) Italy (solo show)
 2013 Terminal art project Lo Studio di Frank Lloyd Wright / Black & White/ Ego Distrutto / Incontri del Premier Terminal di Fermo edited by Stefanie Kreuzer (solo show)
 2014 Air Terminal Terminal Art Project / Elisabetta Terragni / Kurt W. Forster / Martina Sauter / Maik + Dirk Löbbert/  Spazio Terminal Fermo (FM) Italy (group show)
 2015 Disordine Scientifico at the convention center San Martino - Stripe Art Festival Fermo
 2016 Dies alles gibt es also Spam Contemporary Gallery Düsseldorf Germany (group show)
 2018 Dies alles gibt es also ''Gegen die Strömung Reise ins Ungewisse”. Museum Morsbroich Leverkusen Germany (group show)

Publications 
 Terminal Art Project, edited by Daniele Cudini, text by: Kurt W. Forster, Daniele Cudini, Elisabetta Terragni, Marco Marcatili, Roberta Capozucca, 2018;
 La Collezione del Colonnello, Daniele Cudini  ph, Francesco Musati, Paolo Monello, Thomas Stradler, Riccardo Franchellucci. Terminal Art Project edizioni, 2017;
 La Casa, Daniele Cudini, Terminal Art Project edizioni, 2017;
 Daniele, Daniele Cudini, Riccardo Franchellucci,Terminal Art Project edizioni, 2016;
 Mostri D'Italia, Daniele Cudini, Angelo Ferracuti, Terminal Art Project edizioni, 2016;
 Terminal Art Project, Daniele Cudini, Francesco Musati, Cinzia Violoni edited by Stefanie Kreuzer, 2013.

Bibliography 
 Gegen die Strömung. Reise ins Ungewisse -  Fritz Emslander and Stefanie Kreuzer, 2018;
 Umanità intensiva -  texts by Stefanie Kreuzer and Vittoria Coen, Damiani publisher, 2008;
 Pantanal, la pittura emerge dalla palude -  edited by Betta Frigieri and Luca Panaro, Paggeriarte publisher, 2007;
 Inspira / Trattieni / Respira -  Demetrio Paperoni, No Code Gallery, 1999;
 In Trance, Studio Annina Nosei Rome project and text by Francesca Pietracci, Joyce & Co publisher, 1994;
 Premio San Carlo Borromeo - Della Permanente museum of Milan, edited by Giampiero Cantoni e Claudio Rizzi,1993;
 Giappone Italia / Giovani Generazioni -  Galleria Nazionale d’Arte Moderna, Japanese Cultural Institute. Edited by Marcella Cossu, text by Augusta Monferini, Shinichiro Asao, Tsuyoshi Chida, Fumio Matsunaga, Koji Watanabe, Carte segrete publisher, 1992;
 Paesaggi Stralunati e Ombrosi - Claudio Cerritelli, Centro Arti Visive Palazzo dei Diamanti Ferrara, 1989.

1963 births
20th-century Italian painters
21st-century Italian painters
20th-century Italian sculptors
20th-century Italian male artists
21st-century Italian sculptors
Italian contemporary artists
Living people
21st-century Italian male artists